Tomáš Necid (born 13 August 1989) is a Czech professional footballer who plays as a striker for Bohemians 1905.

He is the older brother of Simona Necidová, who is also an international footballer.

Club career

Early years
Necid played his first match for the senior team of SK Slavia Prague in September 2006, when he was just 17 years old. A month later, he scored his first league goal.

Loan to Jablonec
In the 2007–08 season, Necid made his debut in the UEFA Champions League, however, he was loaned to FK Jablonec for the second half of the season. Despite playing only 14 matches (of 30), he was Jablonec's top scorer of the season with five goals. When Necid came to FK Jablonec they were in 15th place (out of 16), which means relegation to a lower league. Nevertheless, the team finished the season in 12th place, and therefore survived, with Necid being one of the heroes of the team. When his loan came to an end, he stated he wanted to return to Slavia and did not want to play for Jablonec again.

At the end of the season, in his first match for Slavia after his return from Jablonec, he scored a goal against Liberec. Slavia Prague won the 2007–08 Gambrinus liga. In 2008, he won the Talent of the Year award at the Czech Footballer of the Year awards.

CSKA Moscow
In August 2008, CSKA Moscow, who were interested in Necid since 2006, signed a deal with Slavia Prague according to which Necid would stay at Slavia until the end of the year and would join CSKA in January 2009. He played his first competitive match for CSKA Moscow on 7 March 2009 in the Russian Super Cup 2009 where he came on as a substitute on the 78th minute and scored the winning goal for his team in extra time in the 113th minute. Before joining CSKA Moscow Necid played 16 games in the 2008–09 Gambrinus liga and scored 11 goals (which was making him the season's top league scorer at the time he left).

In his debut match for CSKA at the 2009 Russian Super Cup, Necid came on as a substitute when the score was 1–1 and scored the winning goal.

In June 2011, Necid suffered a knee injury that required two operations and it sidelined him for 22 months (until April 2013).

Loan to PAOK
Necid signed for PAOK for the 2013–14 season to gain more playing time with Olympiacos, Rennes and Twente all interested.

Loan to Slavia Prague
On 6 January 2014, Slavia Prague announced signing Necid on loan to the end of 2013–14 season.

Loan to Zwolle
In August 2014, he was sent on loan to Dutch Eredivisie side PEC Zwolle.

Return to CSKA Moscow
His loan ended in January 2015 and he returned to CSKA Moscow. After being linked with Chievo Verona, Necid dissolved his contract with CSKA on 2 February 2015.

PEC Zwolle
He returned to PEC Zwolle as a free agent and signed a contract until the end of the season.

Bursaspor
On 2 July 2015, Necid signed four-year contract for Turkish Süper Lig side Bursaspor. He came the club for a key role in filling the shoes of top goalscorer from 2014–15 season, Fernandão.

Loan to Legia Warsaw
On 30 January 2017, he was loaned to Legia Warsaw for a half-year.

Third spell at Slavia Prague
On 1 September 2017, Necid rejoined Slavia Prague on a season-long loan deal. On 9 May 2018, he played as Slavia Prague won the 2017–18 Czech Cup final against FK Jablonec. He left Slavia after the loan was over.

ADO Den Haag
On 28 August 2018, he joined Dutch side ADO Den Haag on a two-year contract after his Bursaspor contract was dissolved.

Bohemians 1905
On 12 October 2020, Necid joined Bohemians 1905 as a free agent and signed a contract until the end of the season.

International career

Youth sides
He finished as a joined top scorer with five goals in five games scored at the 2006 UEFA European Under-17 Football Championship, where the Czech Republic won a silver medal.

He became the top scorer of 2008 UEFA European Under-19 Football Championship, with four goals in four games. At that tournament the Czech Republic reached the semi-final.

Necid is to be part of the Czech U-20 team at the 2009 FIFA U-20 World Cup.

Senior side
His first match with the senior team took place on 19 November 2008, in a qualification match against San Marino. The Czech national football team won 3–0, with Necid scoring the third goal. After that, Necid scored three goals in World Cup qualification. He scored his fifth goal in a 4–2 win over the US in an international friendly on 25 May 2010. His sixth was scored in a 4–1 win over Latvia.

Career statistics

Club

International

Scores and results list Czech Republic's goal tally first, score column indicates score after each Necid goal.

Honours
Slavia Prague
 Czech League: 2007–08, 2008–09
 Czech Cup: 2017–18

CSKA Moscow
 Russian Premier League: 2012–13
 Russian Cup: 2008–09, 2010–11
 Russian Super Cup: 2009, 2013

Czech Republic U17
UEFA European Under-17 Championship runner-up: 2006

Individual
 UEFA European Under-17 Football Championship top scorer: 2006
 UEFA European Under-19 Football Championship top scorer: 2008
 Czech Footballer of the Year: 2008 (Talent of the Year)

References

External links
 
 
 
 

1989 births
Living people
Footballers from Prague
Association football forwards
Czech footballers
Czech Republic youth international footballers
Czech Republic under-21 international footballers
Czech Republic international footballers
Czech expatriate footballers
Czech First League players
Russian Premier League players
Super League Greece players
Eredivisie players
Süper Lig players
Ekstraklasa players
PFC CSKA Moscow players
PAOK FC players
SK Slavia Prague players
FK Jablonec players
PEC Zwolle players
Bursaspor footballers
Legia Warsaw players
ADO Den Haag players
Expatriate footballers in Russia
Czech expatriate sportspeople in Russia
Expatriate footballers in Greece
Czech expatriate sportspeople in Greece
Expatriate footballers in the Netherlands
Czech expatriate sportspeople in the Netherlands
Expatriate footballers in Turkey
Czech expatriate sportspeople in Turkey
Expatriate footballers in Poland
Czech expatriate sportspeople in Poland
UEFA Euro 2012 players
UEFA Euro 2016 players
Bohemians 1905 players